No. 226 Squadron RAF was a unit of the British Royal Air Force that existed as a bomber squadron during the First and Second World Wars, and as part of the UK's nuclear ballistic missile force in the early 1960s.

Squadron history
First formed on 1 April 1918 at Pizzone, Italy, by re-designating the Bombing School Pizzone, No. 226 Squadron operated fast bombers and fighter aircraft and formed No. 472, 473 and 474 (Fighter) Flights within it in September 1918. After the Armistice the squadron was disbanded at Taranto, Italy.

As part of the re-armament plan No. 226 Squadron was reformed at RAF Upper Heyford, as a light bomber squadron, on 15 March 1937, flying Fairey Battle light bombers. Deployed to France as part of the Advanced Air Striking Force, No. 226 Squadron suffered heavy losses during the Battle of France, retreating westwards and evacuating from Brest in mid-June 1940.

The squadron was re-assembled at RAF Sydenham, moving to East Anglia and re-equipping with Douglas Havoc, Douglas Boston and North American Mitchell medium bombers, whilst carrying out attacks on German ports and anti-shipping strikes.

Operation Overlord in 1944 saw No. 226 Squadron become part of the 2nd Tactical Air Force, supporting the invasion in Normandy and the Allied advance to Germany. The squadron was disbanded shortly after hostilities ceased, at Gilze-Rijen airfield, on 20 September 1945.

The squadron was reformed in 1959 as one of twenty Strategic Missile (SM) squadrons associated with Project Emily equipped with three Douglas PGM-17 Thor Intermediate range ballistic missiles, based at RAF Catfoss in Yorkshire as part of the Driffield group of Thor launch sites.

During the 1962 Cuban Missile Crisis, the squadron was kept at full readiness, with the missiles aimed at strategic targets in the USSR. Resolution of the missile crisis included the de-activation of the Thor and Jupiter IRBMs in the United Kingdom, Italy and Turkey. The squadron was disbanded with the termination of Project Emily in 1963.

See also
List of RAF Regiment units
List of Fleet Air Arm aircraft squadrons
List of Army Air Corps aircraft units
List of Air Training Corps squadrons
List of Royal Air Force units & establishments
List of Royal Air Force schools
List of Royal Air Force aircraft independent flights
List of Battle of Britain squadrons
University Air Squadron
Air Experience Flight
Volunteer Gliding Squadron

References

Citations

Bibliography

External links

 

   

226